Benjamin K. Miller may refer to:

Benjamin Kurtz Miller (1857–1928), Milwaukee attorney and philatelist 
Benjamin K. Miller (judge) (born 1938), justice of the Supreme Court of Illinois from 1984 to 2001